Windsor is a village and former town in Dane County, Wisconsin. The population was 8,754 at the time of the 2020 census. The communities of Lake Windsor, Morrisonville, and Token Creek are located within the village. Windsor voted to incorporate as a village on November 3, 2015; prior to its incorporation, it was a town, and a portion of the town was a census-designated place. Windsor is a part of the Census Bureau's Madison metropolitan statistical area.

A portion of the former town was part of a disputed annexation by the Village of DeForest. In July 2004, the village and town reached a settlement in which part of the disputed area would be annexed by the village and part would remain with the town. In addition, the town and village agreed to exchange other less populated land.

History
While visited in the late 1830s, the first settler to the town was William Lawrence, who came from the state of Vermont in 1841. He later served in the Civil War. James Morrison settled in the town in 1843 at what is now Morrisonville.

Geography
According to the United States Census Bureau, the town has a total area of 30.8 square miles (79.9 km2), of which, 30.7 square miles (79.6 km2) of it is land and 0.1 square miles (0.3 km2) of it (0.32%) is water.

Demographics

As of the census of 2000, there were 5,286 people, 1,880 households, and 1,549 families living in the town. The population density was 172.0 people per square mile (66.4/km2). There were 1,923 housing units at an average density of 62.6 per square mile (24.2/km2). The racial makeup of the town was 96.71% White, 0.45% Black or African American, 0.32% Native American, 0.93% Asian, 0.04% Pacific Islander, 0.44% from other races, and 1.12% from two or more races. 1.15% of the population were Hispanic or Latino of any race.

There were 1,880 households, out of which 41.4% had children under the age of 18 living with them, 71.8% were married couples living together, 7.1% had a female householder with no husband present, and 17.6% were non-families. 11.8% of all households were made up of individuals, and 3.1% had someone living alone who was 65 years of age or older. The average household size was 2.80 and the average family size was 3.05.

In the town the population was spread out, with 28.6% under the age of 18, 6.3% from 18 to 24, 31.4% from 25 to 44, 27.1% from 45 to 64, and 6.6% who were 65 years of age or older. The median age was 37 years. For every 100 females, there were 98.6 males. For every 100 females age 18 and over, there were 99.4 males.

The median income for a household in the town was $67,610, and the median income for a family was $73,042. Males had a median income of $41,745 versus $29,921 for females. The per capita income for the town was $29,266. None of the families and 0.5% of the population were living below the poverty line, including no under eighteens and none of those over 64.

The population of the Windsor census-designated place was 3,573 at the 2010 census. As of the census of 2000, there were 2,533 people, 945 households, and 746 families living in the CDP. The population density was 308.5/km2 (800.2/mi2). There were 978 housing units at an average density of 119.1/km2 (309.0/mi2). The racial makeup of the CDP was 96.13% White, 0.51% Black or African American, 0.36% Native American, 1.18% Asian, 0.59% from other races, and 1.22% from two or more races. Hispanic or Latino of any race were 1.46% of the population.

There were 945 households, out of which 38.0% had children under the age of 18 living with them, 67.0% were married couples living together, 8.5% had a female householder with no husband present, and 21.0% were non-families. 13.9% of all households were made up of individuals, and 3.0% had someone living alone who was 65 years of age or older. The average household size was 2.67 and the average family size was 2.95.

In the CDP the population was spread out, with 27.0% under the age of 18, 6.8% from 18 to 24, 32.3% from 25 to 44, 27.0% from 45 to 64, and 6.8% who were 65 years of age or older. The median age was 36 years. For every 100 females, there were 98.8 males. For every 100 females age 18 and over, there were 100.0 males.

The median income for a household in the CDP was $61,958, and the median income for a family was $69,150. Males had a median income of $41,232 versus $27,863 for females. The per capita income for the CDP was $31,529. None of the families and 1.0% of the population were living below the poverty line, including no under eighteens and none of those over 64.

Education
The only public school in Windsor is Windsor Elementary School, serving grades K-4. Windsor is served by DeForest Area School District, which operates several additional schools in nearby DeForest.

Notable residents 
Clara Bewick Colby, writer
Michael Johnson, state representative
Clement Warner, farmer, colonel in the Iron Brigade and later a state legislator

References

External links
 Village of Windsor

Villages in Dane County, Wisconsin
Madison, Wisconsin, metropolitan statistical area
Villages in Wisconsin